Mondi plc is a multinational packaging and paper group employing around 21,000 people with around 100 production sites across more than 30 countries, predominantly in Europe, Russia, North America and South Africa. Group offices are located in Weybridge, United Kingdom and Vienna, Austria. Mondi is fully integrated across the packaging and paper value chain – from the growing of wood and the manufacturing of pulp and paper (packaging paper and uncoated fine paper), to the conversion of packaging papers into corrugated packaging, industrial bags, extrusion coatings and release liner.  It has listings on the Johannesburg Stock Exchange and the London Stock Exchange and is a constituent of the FTSE 100 Index.

History
Mondi has its roots in South Africa where, in 1967, the company's former owner, Anglo American plc, built the Merebank Mill in Durban.

In 2000 the company increased its holdings in Neusiedler AG and Frantschach AG, both Austrian businesses, to 100% and 70% respectively. Also in 2000 it acquired Cofinec, a Polish business. It increased its holding in the Syktyvkar Mill in the Komi Republic to 90% in 2002.

In 2004 Mondi further increased its holdings in Frantschach AG, one of its Austrian businesses, to 100% and in Celuloza Świecie AG, another Polish business, to 71% (and then changed its name to Mondi Packaging Paper Świecie).

On 2 July 2007 the company demerged from its former parent company Anglo American plc, and became a dual-listed company, with Mondi Limited listed on the Johannesburg Stock Exchange and Mondi plc listed on the London Stock Exchange.

In 2011 Mondi demerged Mondi Packaging South Africa (listed as Mpact on Johannesburg Stock Exchange).

In 2012 Mondi acquired Nordenia to extend its consumer packaging business.

In May 2017 Peter Oswald was appointed as new group chief executive officer. In the same year, the approval of the €335 million Štětí mill modernisation (Czech Republic) happened.

In 2019 Mondi completed the simplification of its corporate structure from dual listed into a single holding company under Mondi plc.

On 1 April 2020 Andrew King succeeded Peter Oswald as Mondi Group's chief executive officer.

On 4 May 2022, Mondi announced plans to divest from its Russian assets. However, in December 2022, The Times reported than the sale of its Russian assets was "still awaiting approval".

In January 2023, it was announced Mondi had completed the acquisition of the Duino paper mill from the Italian graphic and speciality paper company, Burgo Group for €40 million.

Sustainability
In 2014 Mondi and WWF began a global partnership to strengthen environmental stewardship in the packaging and paper sector. In 2017 Mondi and WWF extended the partnership for three more years until 2020. In 2018 Mondi and WWF announced that Mondi had joined WWF Climate Savers and committed to reduce specific production-related greenhouse gas (GHG) emissions to 0.25 t CO2e/t production by 2050.

The company is a signatory and advocate of the Global Compact, a UN initiative for business committed to universally accepted principles in the areas of human rights, labour, environment and anti-corruption.

Standardised parameters are applied to monitor the environmental impact of the production processes. Mondi defined its product responsibility on the basis of the UNEP Life Cycle Initiative.

In 2020 Mondi received a platinum CSR rating from EcoVadis, placing Mondi in the top 1% of companies in its sector for sustainability measures around the environment, labour, human rights, ethics and sustainable procurement.

In 2021 Mondi started a new project together with World Food Programme, where main focus is working together to develop packaging that delivers — for people and the planet, creating a packaging that can help safeguard the environment and fight hunger.

References

External links 
Official site 

Pulp and paper companies of South Africa
Manufacturing companies established in 1967
Pulp and paper companies of the United Kingdom
1967 establishments in South Africa
Companies listed on the Johannesburg Stock Exchange
Companies listed on the London Stock Exchange
Packaging companies of South Africa